Amictoides is a genus of flies in the family Empididae.

Species
A. poecilus (Philippi, 1865)

References

Empidoidea genera
Empididae